Ikobi, or Ikobi-Mena after its two varieties, is a Papuan language, or pair of languages, of Papua New Guinea. Wurm and Hattori (1981) treat the two varieties, Ikobi and Mena, as distinct languages, but Ethnologue 16 judges them to be one.

References

Turama–Kikorian languages
Languages of Papua New Guinea